William Raymond Pearson is professor of biochemistry and molecular Genetics in the School of Medicine at the University of Virginia. Pearson is best known for the development of the FASTA format.

Education
Pearson graduated with a BS in chemistry from the University of Illinois Urbana-Champaign. He received his PhD in 1977 from Caltech.

Career and research
After his PhD, Pearson did a postdoctoral fellowship at Johns Hopkins University. Pearson's research interests are in computational biology. He was awarded Fellowship of the  International Society for Computational Biology (ISCB) in 2018 for outstanding contributions to the fields of computational biology and bioinformatics.

References

Living people
American bioinformaticians
University of Virginia faculty
Year of birth missing (living people)